Bronagh O'Hanlon (born 1951) is an Irish lawyer who was as a judge of the High Court between 2014 and 2021.

Early life 
O'Hanlon studied in Trinity College Dublin and the King's Inns. She was called to the bar in 1989 and became a senior counsel in 2005. Her practice primarily consisted of civil litigation and family law matters. She is a former chairperson of the Family Lawyers Association of Ireland. She was a panel member under the Garda Síochána Disciplinary Regulations.

Judicial career 
She was appointed to the High Court in January 2014. Her case load has included many cases involving personal injuries, medical negligence, and family law matters. She has also heard cases seeking injunctive relief and bail cases.

She approved the first ever service of documents via LinkedIn in Ireland in a liquidation case in 2014.

O'Hanlon retired as a judge on 13 November 2021. In January 2022, Simon Coveney appointed her to chair an independent review into issues of sexual misconduct, bullying and harassment in the Defence Forces.

Personal life 
O'Hanlon is married to Seamus Cannon. She can speak fluent Irish and French.

References 

Living people
High Court judges (Ireland)
Alumni of Trinity College Dublin
Irish women judges
1951 births
Alumni of King's Inns
21st-century Irish judges
21st-century women judges